Linhe is a town under the administration of Siyang County, Jiangsu, China. , it has two residential communities and 12 villages under its administration.

References 

Township-level divisions of Jiangsu
Siyang County